The Carlos Palanca Memorial Awards for Literature winners for 2013. The awarding ceremonies were held on September 1, 2013, at the Peninsula Hotel Manila in Makati.

Awards

Filipino division

Tula (Poetry)

1st: Manansala by Enrique S Villasis
2nd: Asal-Hayop by Mark Anthony Angeles
3rd: Lobo sa Loob by Kristian Sendon Cordero

Tulang Pambata (Poetry written for children)

1st: Harana ng Kuliglig by Eugene Y Evasco
2nd: Family Tree ng Tumubo sa Anit by April Jade I. Biglaen
3rd: Sisid by Alvin Capili Ursua
f u

Maikling Kuwento (Short story)

1st: Bayanggudaw by Lilia Quindoza Santiago
2nd: Pamamanhikan by Bernadette Villanueva Neri
3rd: Ad Astra per Aspera by Kristian Sendon Cordero

Maikling Kuwentong Pambata (Short story for children)

1st: Ang Paglalakbay ni Pipoy Piso by Maryrose Jairene C Cruz
2nd: Ang Singsing-Pari sa Pisara by Eugene Y Evasco and Chris Martinez
3rd: Salusalo Para Kay Kuya by Lucky Virgo Joyce Tinio

Nobela (Novel)

Grand prize: Tatlong Gabi, Tatlong Araw by Eros Sanchez Atalia

Dulang Pampelikula (Screenplay)

1st: NO WINNER
2nd: Kung Paano Maghiwalay by George A de Jesus III
3rd: The Revenge of the Comfort Woman by Patrick John R Valencia

Dulang Ganap ang Haba (Full-length play)

1st: NO WINNER
2nd: NO WINNER
3rd: Dhahran Queens Manila by Luciano Sonny O Valencia

Dulang May Isang Yugto (One Act Play)

1st: Mga Kuneho by Miguel Antonio Alfredo V Luarca
2nd: Kapit by George A de Jesus III
3rd: Pamamanhikan Bernadette Villanueva Neri

Sanaysay (Essay)

1st: Our Lady of Imelda by Kristian Sendon Cordero
2nd: Gabay sa Gurong-Likod by Salvador T Biglaen
3rd: Mga Birtwal na Karahasan by Laurence Marvin S Castillo

English division

Essay

1st: The Krakauer Table by Shakira Andrea C Sison
2nd: Under My Invisible Umbrella by Laurel Anne Fantauzzo
3rd: Voices from the Village by Maria Neobie G Gonzalez

Poetry for children

1st: Attack of the Persistent Cold Virus and Other Poems by Mia A Buenaventura
2nd: Mr. Bully and Other Poems for children by Francis C Macansantos
3rd: Monsters Under My Bed by Kathleen Aton-Osias

Short story for children

1st: Marvino's League of Superheroes by Nadeth Rae E Rival
2nd: The Magic Bahag by Cheeno Marlo Sayuno
3rd: A Thousand of Paper Cranes by Patricia Marie Grace S Gomez

Full-length play

1st: End of the Gallows by Jay M Crisostomo IV
2nd: The Son of Ashes by Mario L Mendez Jr
3rd: Collection by Floy C Quintos

One-act play

1st: Blue Eyes, Allan B Lopez
2nd: Debrief by Lystra Aranal
3rd: Call of Duty by Danilo Nino Calalang

Poetry

1st: Pastoral and Other Poems by Mikael de Lara Co
2nd: Crown for Maria by Carlomar Arcangel Daoana
3rd: Animal Experiments by Joy Anne Icayan

Regional division

Short story - Cebuano

1st: Tubod by Jona Branzuela Bering
2nd: Ang Batang Tamsi by Richel G Dorotan
3rd: Padre Botox by Noel P Tuazon

Short story - Hiligaynon

1st: Si Padre Olan Kag Ang Dios by Peter Solis Nery
2nd: Ulubrahon by Norman Tagudinay Darap
3rd: Torbik by Alice Tan Gonzales

Short story - Ilokano

1st: NO WINNER
2nd: Bagnos Payegpeg Beterano by Danilo B Antalan
3rd: Ti Palimed Ni Katugangak by Gorgonia B Serrano

Kabataan division

Kabataan sanaysay

1st: Ang Alamat Ng Batang Manunulat by Rowin C de Leon
2nd: Pagkatok Ng Dumagundong Na Manok sa Umaga by Annette Irina C Tanlimco
3rd: Deus Ex Machina: Sapagkat Tayo ay Bulag Pa by Rajee S Florido

Kabataan essay

1st: Hymns of the Mountains, Dreams of the Stars by Marc Christian M Lopez
2nd: Panacea by Vicah Adrienne P Villanueva
3rd: Manifesto of Literature by Pauline Samantha B Sagayo
4th

External links 
Palanca Awards 2013 complete list of winners
WINNERS: The 63rd Palanca Awards

2013
Palanca
2013 in the Philippines